Robert Maveau (14 September 1944 – 25 November 1978) was a Belgian cyclist. He competed in the men's sprint and the 1000m time trial events at the 1972 Summer Olympics.

References

1944 births
1978 deaths
Belgian male cyclists
Olympic cyclists of Belgium
Cyclists at the 1972 Summer Olympics
Cyclists from Antwerp